"Blank Marquee" is a song by Malaysian singer Yuna featuring American rapper G-Eazy, released as a second single for her fourth international studio album (her seventh overall), Rouge. It is co-written by Yuna, Chloe Angelides, Robin Hannibal and G-Eazy, with Hannibal serves as the producer. The song was released on 16 May 2019 by Verve Music Group.

Music video
The music video for "Blank Marquee" was directed by Yuna's husband, Adam Sinclair and features award-winning actor Amerul Affendi and US-based Malaysian supermodel Atikah Karim. The video was filmed in some locations in Kuala Lumpur including Bukit Bintang and Kuala Lumpur Convention Centre (KLCC). Some scenes in the video also filmed at The Kuala Lumpur Journal hotel.

The music video was released on Yuna's official YouTube and Vevo account at the official launch date.

Critical reception
Rania Aniftos from Billboard wrote that the song follows "a suspicious deal that transpires in Malaysia's capital of Kuala Lumpur". Nada Mesh from HotNewHipHop deemed it as "a beat reminiscent of a Pharell and Daft Punk type song". Skylar de Paul from The Daily Californian said that the song was "an empowering lo-fi funk" and felt that the track is "a melodic argument between both sides of the disagreement, and boy is it entertaining". Adriane Pontecorvo from PopMatters described that Yuna's refrain of the song "that sells this as a song to belt out even as the singer keeps things subtle".

Personnel
Song
 Yuna – vocal, composition
 Chloe Angelides, Robin Hannibal and Gerald Gillum – composition

Music video
 Amerul Affendi – The Villain
 Atikah Karim – The Driver
 Noorul-Hudaa – extras 
 Elena Laurel Moujing – extras  
 Tess Pang – extras
 Anessa Alsagoff – extras
 Adam Sinclair – director
 Kroll Azry, Jorene Chew – producer
 Eric Hu – executive producer
 Aidil Razali – director of photography
 Rabbani Sujak – art director
 Yeoh Po Li – make-up artist
 Ajay Kumar – editor
 Pitt Haniff – assistant producer
 Haida Yusof-Yeomans, Zulvanny Andiny – stylist

Charts

Release history

References

2019 singles
2019 songs
Yuna (singer) songs
G-Eazy songs
Songs written by Yuna (singer)
Songs written by Chloe Angelides
Songs written by Robin Hannibal
Male–female vocal duets
Songs written by G-Eazy